Wooster is an unincorporated community in Johnson Township, Scott County, in the U.S. state of Indiana.

History
An old variant name of the community was called Woostertown. A post office called Woostertown was established in 1861, and remained in operation until 1875. The community's name is derived from Worcester, Massachusetts, according to local history.

Geography

References

Unincorporated communities in Scott County, Indiana
Unincorporated communities in Indiana